Vallée d’Aoste Lard d’Arnad (PDO) is a variety of lardo (a cured pork product) produced exclusively within the municipal boundaries of the commune of Arnad in lower Aosta Valley, Italy. It was awarded European Union protected designation of origin (PDO) status in 1996 and is promoted by the Comité pour la valorisation des produits typiques d'Arnad - Lo Doil producers association.

Description 

The lard, one of a number of preserved meat specialties of the region, is produced by curing pieces of fatback in a brine aromatised with such herbs and spices as juniper, bay, nutmeg, sage and rosemary. The brining takes place in wooden tubs known as doïls, which may be made of chestnut, oak or larch, and are used solely for this purpose; it is known that Lard d’Arnad has been made for more than two centuries since a 1763 inventory from Arnad Castle refers to four doïls which belonged to its kitchens. It is often eaten with black bread and honey.

The traditional Féhta dou lar (Arnad Francoprovençal patois for Lard Festival) is a Sagra held each year on the last Sunday of August. It has become a significant tourist attraction.

References

External links

Vallée d’Aoste Lard d’Arnad - Aosta Valley official tourism board (multilingual)
 Vallée d'Aoste Lard d'Arnad (DOP), Italianmade.com 

Italian cuisine
Salumi
Italian products with protected designation of origin
Bacon
Cuisine of Aosta Valley
Arnad